Cytidine (symbol C or Cyd) is a nucleoside molecule that is formed when cytosine is attached to a ribose ring (also known as a ribofuranose) via a β-N1-glycosidic bond. Cytidine is a component of RNA. It is a white water-soluble solid. which is only slightly soluble in ethanol.

Dietary sources
Dietary sources of cytidine include foods with high RNA (ribonucleic acid) content, such as organ meats, brewer's yeast, as well as pyrimidine-rich foods such as beer. During digestion, RNA-rich foods are broken-down into ribosyl pyrimidines (cytidine and uridine), which are absorbed intact.  In humans, dietary cytidine is converted into uridine, which is probably the compound behind cytidine's metabolic effects.

Cytidine analogues
A variety of cytidine analogues are known, some with potentially useful pharmacology. For example, KP-1461 is an anti-HIV agent that works as a viral mutagen, and zebularine exists in E. coli and is being examined for chemotherapy.  Low doses of azacitidine and its analog decitabine have shown results against cancer through epigenetic demethylation.

Biological actions
In addition to its role as a pyrimidine component of RNA, cytidine has been found to control neuronal-glial glutamate cycling, with supplementation decreasing midfrontal/cerebral glutamate/glutamine levels. As such, cytidine has generated interest as a potential glutamatergic antidepressant drug.

Related compounds
 Deoxycytidine is cytosine attached to a deoxyribose.

Properties

References

External links
 Cytidine MS Spectrum

Nucleosides
Pyrimidones
Hydroxymethyl compounds